Dibu Ojerinde is a Nigerian professor of Tests and Measurement, educational administrator and a former Registrar of the Joint Admissions and Matriculation Board, JAMB.

Life and career
He was born in Igboho, Oyo State, Nigeria. He attended Wesley College, Ibadan where he received the Teacher Grade II Certificate Examinations (TC II) in 1964. He later attended  Adeyemi College of Education where he obtained the Nigeria Certificate in Education (N.C. E) in 1968. He proceeded to the prestigious  Obafemi Awolowo University for a Bachelor of science (B.sc) degree in education in 1973 and a Master of education (M. Ed) in 1975. He later proceeded to  Cornell University, Ithaca, New York where he received a Ph. D degree in Educational measurement in 1978. He became a Professor of  Tests and Measurement in October 1986.
He began his career as a secondary school teacher in 1965 at Laogun Methodist Grammar School. He left to Ibada Iseyin District Grammar School, Iseyin in 1970 and later College of Advanced Studies, Kano in 1975.
He joined the services of Obafemi Awolowo University, Ile-Ife in 1973 and was appointed a Director of Institute of Education in the same university in 1984, a tenure that ended in 1990.
He is the first Nigerian Professor of Tests and Measurement. 
In 1990, he was appointed as the Director of Monitoring and Evaluation, National Primary Education Commission (NPEC), a tenure that elapsed in 1991.
In 1991 he was appointed as the Director and Consultant at Centre for Educational Measurement (CEM), Federal Ministry of Education. After his tenure in 1992, he was appointed as the Registrar of the National Board for Educational Measurement, NBEM. He held this position for 7 years (1992 – 1999). Shortly after his tenure as of the National Board for Educational Measurement (NBEM) in 1999, he was appointed as the Registrar of National Examination Council, NECO. He held this position for 8 years (1999 – 2007).
After his tenure in 2007, he was appointed as Registrar of the Joint Admissions and Matriculation Board, JAMB, a position he held for 5 years (2007-2012) and was reappointed on 10 April 2012.

Professional association
President of the International Association for Educational Assessment,  IAEA.
Vice president of the Association for Educational Assessment in Africa, AEAA.
Member of the Nigerian Psychological Association, NPA
Member of the Educational Studies Association of Nigeria.

See also
 Joint Admissions and Matriculation Board, JAMB

References

Living people
Cornell University alumni
Adeyemi College of Education alumni
Obafemi Awolowo University alumni
People from Oyo State
Nigerian educational theorists
Academic staff of Obafemi Awolowo University
Year of birth missing (living people)